Martakert Province is a province of the Republic of Artsakh, de jure part of the Republic of Azerbaijan. The population is mainly Armenian. The province has 43 communities of which one is considered urban and 42 are rural.

Cultural sites
The Gandzasar monastery, the Yeghishe Arakyal Monastery and the 17th century Armenian monastery Yerits Mankants are located in the province. The Vankasar Monastery is just outside the town of Martakert. The archaeological site of Tigranakert of Artsakh is also located in the province, thought to have been founded in the 2nd-1st century B.C, it has been undergoing excavation since 2005. Some of the walls of the city, with Hellenistic-style towers, as well as Armenian basilicas dating to fifth to seventh centuries have been uncovered.

References

See also 
 Surp Hovhannes Mkrtich Church

 
Regions of the Republic of Artsakh